Trioceros kinangopensis, the Aberdare Mountains dwarf chameleon, is a species of chameleon found in Kenya.

References

Trioceros
Reptiles described in 2012
Taxa named by Karl Patterson Schmidt
Reptiles of Kenya